= Great American Bathroom Book =

Series of books

The Great American Bathroom Book is a three-volume book series published in 1992, 1993 and 1994 (one volume each year) by Compact Classics. UK English versions of Vol. 1 and Vol. 2 were reprinted as Passing Time in the Loo by Scarab Book Limited.

== Vol. 1 ==
Published by Compact Classics, June 1992

ISBN 1-880184-04-4

Contents include:

- Summaries of classic literature
- Biographies
- Business & Leadership
- Word Power
- Sports Summaries—How Games are Played
- Trivia
- Notable quotes from authors, religions, spirituality, dignitaries and other sources

== Vol. 2 ==
Published by Compact Classics, November 1993

ISBN 1-880184-10-9

== Vol. 3 ==
Published by Compact Classics, November 1994

ISBN 1-880184-26-5

== Passing Time in the Loo ==
Published by Scarab Book Limited

- Volume 1: ISBN 0-9537357-1-0
- Volume 2:ISBN 978-0-9537357-9-2
- Volume 3:ISBN 0-9537357-3-7
